Events in the year 1911 in Japan. It corresponds to Meiji 44 (明治44年) in the Japanese calendar.

Incumbents
Emperor: Emperor Meiji
Prime Minister:
Katsura Tarō (until August 30)
Saionji Kinmochi (starting August 30)

Governors
Aichi Prefecture: Ichizo Fukano
Akita Prefecture: Mori Masataka
Aomori Prefecture: Takeda Chiyosaburo
Ehime Prefecture: Takio Izawa
Fukui Prefecture: Nakamura Junkuro
Fukushima Prefecture: Shotaro Nishizawa
Gifu Prefecture: Sadakichi Usu
Gunma Prefecture: Uruji Kamiyama
Hiroshima Prefecture: Tadashi Munakata
Ibaraki Prefecture: Keisuke Sakanaka
Iwate Prefecture: Shinichi Kasai
Kagawa Prefecture: Kogoro Kanokogi
Kochi Prefecture: Goro Sugiyama
Kumamoto Prefecture: Kawaji Toshikyo
Kyoto Prefecture: Baron Shoichi Omori
Mie Prefecture: Kubota Kiyochika, Magoichi Tahara
Miyagi Prefecture: Hiroyuki Terada
Miyazaki Prefecture: Tadayoshi Naokichi then Tadakazu Ariyoshi
Nagano Prefecture: Chiba Sadamiki
Nara Prefecture: Prince Kiyoshi Honba then Mori Masataka then Izawa Takio
Niigata Prefecture: Prince Kiyoshi Honba
Okinawa Prefecture: Shigeaki Hibi
Osaka Prefecture: Marques Okubo Toshi Takeshi
Saga Prefecture: Shimada Gotaro
Saitama Prefecture: Shimada Gotaro
Shiname Prefecture: Maruyama Shigetoshi then Takaoka Naokichi
Tochigi Prefecture: ..... then Okada Bunji
Tokyo: Hiroshi Abe
Tottori Prefecture: Oka Kishichiro Itami
Toyama Prefecture: Mabuchi Eitaro
Yamagata Prefecture: Mabuchi Eitaro

Events
February unknown – Kobayashi Gas Appliance Manufacturing, as predecessor of Paloma, a gas cooking and heating appliance manufacturing brand, was founded in Nagoya.   
February 1 – Regulations for postal special delivery are passed. Service begins on February 11.
February 22 – One of Japan's most well-known authors, Natsume Sōseki, sends a letter to the Ministry of Education, refusing the title of professor of literature. He explains that he just wants to go on living his life as "Natsume so-and-so."
March 1 – The Imperial Theater is completed, but is later lost to fire during the Great Kanto earthquake.
March 29 – Japan passes its first labor law.
April 23 – Yoshitoshi Tokugawa sets a Japanese record with a Blériot Aéronautique, flying 48 miles in 1 hour 9 minutes 30 seconds.
May Unknown date – Tamura Fishery Association, as predecessor of Nissui, founded in Shimonoseki, Yamaguchi Prefecture.
June 20 – Idemitsu Shokai, as predecessor of Idemitsu Showa Shell Petroleum, founded in Moji, now part of Kitakyushu, Fukuoka Prefecture. 
August 30 – Saionji Kinmochi is appointed Prime Minister of Japan.
September – Five women: Hiratsuka Raichō, Yasumochi Yoshiko, Mozume Kazuko, Kiuchi Teiko, and Nakano Hatsuko begin publishing the literary magazine Seitosha to promote the equal rights of women through literature and education.
Unknown Dated – Namura Shipbuildings was founded in Osaka.

Births
January 11 – Zenko Suzuki, politician, 70th Prime Minister of Japan (d. 2004)
January 13 – Masayuki Mori, actor (d. 1973)
February 5 – Mitsuo Nakamura, writer (d. 1988)
February 7 – Takako Irie, film actress (d. 1995)
February 15 – Kimiyoshi Yasuda, film director (d. 1983)
February 26 – Tarō Okamoto, artist (d. 1996)
April 8 – Ichirō Fujiyama, composer and singer (d. 1993)
May 7 – Ishirō Honda, film director (d. 1993)
May 21 – Tanie Kitabayashi, actress (d. 2010)
October 4 – Shigeaki Hinohara, physician (d. 2017)
October 21 – Yoshinori Yagi, author (d. 1999)
November 30 – Tamura Taijiro, novelist (d. 1983)
December 10 – Tatsugo Kawaishi, swimmer (d. 1945)
December 26 – Kikuko Tokugawa, later "Kikuko, Princess Takamatsu", wife of Prince Nobuhito (d. 2004)

Deaths
January 19 – Chizuko Mifune, clairvoyant (b. 1886)
January 24:
Uchiyama Gudō, Zen Buddhist priest and anarcho-socialist (executed) (b. 1874)
Shūsui Kōtoku, journalist and anarchist (executed) (b. 1871)
Kanno Sugako, journalist, feminist and anarchist (executed) (b. 1881)
March 25 – Shigeru Aoki, painter (b.1882)
June 15 – Ōtori Keisuke, diplomat (b. 1833)
September 16 – Hishida Shunsō, painter (b. 1874)
November 11 – Otojirō Kawakami, actor and comedian (b. 1864)
November 25 – Komura Jutarō, politician (b. 1855)

References

 
1910s in Japan
Japan
Years of the 20th century in Japan